The BPF Party is a political party in Belarus. It was de facto established after the split of the social movement Belarusian Popular Front (abbr. BPF;) in 1999. The Belarusian Popular Front was founded during the Perestroika era by members of the Belarusian intelligentsia, including Vasil Bykaŭ. Its first and most charismatic leader was Zianon Pazniak.

Early history

The Belarusian Popular Front was established in 1988 as both a political party and a cultural movement, following the examples of the Popular Front of Estonia, Popular Front of Latvia and the Lithuanian pro-democracy movement Sąjūdis. Membership was declared open to all Belarusian citizens as well as any democratic organization.

Its alleged goals are democracy and independence through national rebirth and rebuilding after the dissolution of the Soviet Union. The main idea of the Front was the revival of the national idea, including a revival of the Belarusian language. Initially, its orientation was pro-Western with a great deal of scepticism towards Russia. At one point they propagated the idea of a union from the Baltic Sea to the Black Sea that would involve Ukraine, Poland, Belarus and Lithuania, similar to Józef Piłsudski's Intermarium.

The party was in favour of removing Russian as an official language in Belarus. Russian became an official language following the 1995 Belarusian referendum, at the beginning of Lukashenko's rule, when a proposal for making Russian a state language received 83.3% support from the turnout.

Among the significant achievements of the Front was the uncovering of the burial site of Kurapaty near Minsk. The Front claims that the NKVD performed extrajudicial killings there.

Initially, the Front had significant visibility because of its numerous public actions that almost always ended in clashes with police and KGB. It was BPF parliamentarians who convinced the Supreme Council of Belarus (the interim Belarusian parliament) to restore the historical Belarusian symbols: the white-red-white flag and the Pahonia coat of arms. During Soviet-times people faced arrest in the streets for displaying white-red-white symbols in Belarus.

In 1994 the BPF formed a so-called "shadow" cabinet consisting of 100 BPF intellectuals. It originally contained 18 commissions that published ideas and proposed laws and plans for restructuring the government and economy. Its last economic reform proposal was published in 1999. In opposition to Alexander Lukashenko's government, the party supports Belarus' entry into NATO and the European Union.

1999 split

In the late 1990s, the Popular Front split into two parties, both of which claim to be the legitimate continuation of the original BPF. The party's conservative wing under Zianon Pazniak became the Conservative Christian Party – BPF while the moderate majority became today's BPF Party.

Modern history, participation in elections
At the 2004 legislative election the party was part of the People's Coalition 5 Plus (Narodnaja Kaalicyja Piaciorka Plus), which did not secure any seats. These elections fell (according to the OSCE/ODIHR Election Observation Mission ) significantly short of OSCE commitments. Universal principles and constitutionally guaranteed rights of expression, association and assembly were seriously violated, calling into question the Belarusian authorities’ willingness to respect the concept of political competition on a basis of equal treatment. According to this mission, the principles of an inclusive democratic process, whereby citizens have the right to seek political office without discrimination, candidates to present their views without obstruction, and voters to learn about them and discuss them freely, were largely ignored.

In October 2005 Alaksandar Milinkievič, a candidate proposed by the BPF and Zialonyja (Belarusian Green Party) was elected the common democratic candidate for the 2006 Presidential election.

During the 2010 presidential election the BPF Party nominated its own candidate for the presidency, who was then the Deputy Chairman of the BPF Party. According to the official results, he gained 1.97% of the votes.

In 2011, following an internal conflict, more than 90 further members left BPF Party, including several prominent veterans of the original Belarusian Popular Front, such as Lyavon Barshchewski, Jury Chadyka, Vincuk Viačorka. This was sometimes described as a "second split" of the Belarusian Popular Front.

In the Congress in September 2017, the new party leader Ryhor Kastusioŭ has been elected. The Congress decided also to nominate Alaksiej Janukievič and Belarusian-American attorney  to the presidential office in the next elections. The final decision about the only candidate has to be made in the future.

On April 12, 2021, Kastusiou was reported to have been arrested by the Belarusian KGB as part of its crackdown on protestors following the results of the 2020 Belarusian presidential election. Officially Kastusiou and BPF members were accused of trying to organise an illegal coup (in which president Alexander Lukashenko was to be assassinated); the Russian FSB together with the KGB have claimed their arrests did prevent the coup to happen. On September 5, 2022, Kastusiou was sentenced to 10 years in jail by the Minsk Regional Court.

Presidential elections

Legislative elections

International relations
The party became an associate member of the International Democrat Union in 2007.

It was an observer member of the European People's Party until 2017. Since 7 April 2017 the party is a member of the Alliance of Conservatives and Reformists in Europe. Its youth wing, BPF Youth, is a member of the European Young Conservatives.

Chairman
 2022–Current Vadzim Sarančukoŭ
2017–2022: Ryhor Kastusioŭ
2009–2017: Alaksiej Janukievich
2007–2009: Lyavon Barshchewski
1999–2007: Vincuk Viačorka

See also
Rada of the Belarusian Democratic Republic - the Belarusian government in exile
Conservative Christian Party – BPF

References

External links
 

1988 establishments in Belarus
1988 establishments in the Soviet Union
Alliance of Conservatives and Reformists in Europe member parties
Belarusian opposition
Belarusian nationalism
Conservative parties in Belarus
International Democrat Union member parties
Political parties established in 1988
Political parties in Belarus
Popular fronts in the Soviet Union
Pro-independence parties in the Soviet Union
Pro-European political parties in Belarus
Right-wing parties in Europe
Right-wing politics in Belarus
Liberal conservative parties